Coal Harbor or Coal Harbour or variant, may refer to:

Coal Harbour (South Georgia)
 Coal Harbour, Vancouver, Lower Mainland, British Columbia, Canada; a neighbourhood
 Vancouver Coal Harbour Seaplane Base (IATA airport code: CXH; ICAO airport code: CYHC) a water aerodrome
 Coal Harbour (Vancouver Island), British Columbia, Canada; a community
 Coal Harbour Water Aerodrome (TC airport code: CAQ3) a water aerodrome
 RCAF Coal Harbour, a defunct Royal Canadian Air Force base, see Coal Harbour (Vancouver Island)
 Coal Harbour Whaling Station, a defunct coaling station and whaling station, see Coal Harbour (Vancouver Island)

See also

 
 
 
 
 
 
 
 
 Harbor (disambiguation)
 Coal (disambiguation)
 Coral Harbour, Nunavut, Canada
 Coaling station, where a ship refuels its coal bunker
 Coalport (disambiguation)
 Cold Harbour (disambiguation)
 Cole Harbour (disambiguation)